Anarsia acaciae is a moth of the  family Gelechiidae. It is found on the Canary Islands, Algeria, Israel and south-western Arabia.

The wingspan is about 13 mm. The forewings are hoary greyish with numerous short longitudinal streaks of greyish fuscous intermixed with lighter and darker shades of the ground colour. The hindwings are shining, somewhat iridescent, bluish grey.

The larvae feed within the seedpods of Acacia edgworthii and Acacia farnesiana.

References

Moths described in 1896
acaciae
Moths of the Arabian Peninsula
Moths of Africa
Moths of the Middle East